Triclavianism is the belief that three nails were used to crucify Jesus Christ. The exact number of the Holy Nails has been a matter of theological debate for centuries. The general modern understanding in the Catholic Church is that Christ was crucified with four nails, but three are sometimes depicted as a symbolic reference to the Holy Trinity.

Albigenses and Waldenses
Triclavianism was one of the beliefs attributed to Albigenses and Waldensians, who held that three nails were used to crucify Christ and that a Roman soldier pierced him with a spear on the left side.

The 19th century Anglican scholar George Stanley Faber claimed that Pope Innocent III declared this to be a heresy and maintained that four nails were used and Jesus was pierced on the right side. This was repeated in historical works such as Sofia Bompiani's A Short History of the Italian Waldenses. Faber's book does not quote any primary source, and does not give the name or date of the document of Innocent III. Other scholarly treatments of the subject, such as Herbert Thurston's article in the 1914 Catholic Encyclopedia, make no mention of any such document.

George Stanley Faber's account of the history in his 1838 work An Inquiry into the History and Theology of the Ancient Vallenses and Albigenses: As Exhibiting, Agreeably to the Promises, The Perpetuity of the Sincere Church of Christ is as follows:

[From footnote on pages 396–8.  Emphasis is Faber's.]

Representation in art
Though in the Middle Ages the crucifixion of Christ typically depicted four nails, beginning in the thirteenth century some Western art began to represent Christ on the cross with his feet placed one over the other and pierced with single nail. The poem Christus patiens attributed to St. Gregory Nazianzus and the writings of Nonnus and Socrates of Constantinople also speak of three nails.

The three nails, as a symbol for the crucifixion of Jesus Christ, are also used on the coats of arms of  Drahovce, Slovakia, Saint Saviour, Jersey, St. Clement Parish, Ottawa and in the seal of the Society of Jesus.

The plant Passiflora edulis (Passion fruit) was given the name by early European explorers because the flower's complex structure and pattern reminded them of symbols associated with the passion of Christ.  It was said that the flower contained the lashes received by Christ, the crown of thorns, the column, the five wounds and the three nails.

See also
Nail (relic)

References

External links
Holy Nails—Entry from the Catholic Encyclopedia discussing the number of nails used.

Christian belief and doctrine
Crucifixion of Jesus